Eois isographata is a moth in the  family Geometridae. It is found in the Amazon region and on Cuba.

References

Moths described in 1863
Eois
Moths of the Caribbean
Moths of South America